"Sing It Back" is a song written and performed by Irish-English electronic music duo Moloko (Róisín Murphy and Mark Brydon). It first appeared in its original version on Moloko's second album, I Am Not a Doctor (1998); it was released as a single on 8 March 1999, reaching number 45 on the UK Singles Chart. The song experienced chart success after it was remixed by DJ Boris Dlugosch, peaking at number four in the UK in September 1999. Murphy had started writing the lyrics while clubbing in New York City, and knew the song was at heart a dance track, but the group wanted to record it in a different artistic fashion for its album version.

Together with their record company they had commissioned mixes by Todd Terry (who had turned Everything But the Girl's "Missing" into an international club anthem). Moloko were not satisfied with the Terry mix and had to convince their label Echo Records to put out the Dlugosch version instead. The remixed version was eventually featured on over 100 compilations, and was later added on Moloko's third album, Things to Make and Do, after hitting the top ten on the UK Singles Chart. In 1999 it reached number one on the US dance chart. As a form of barter for the remix, Moloko vocalist Róisín Murphy later co-wrote and appeared on Dlugosch's "Never Enough" single, starring in the video for that release as well.

Critical reception
Scottish newspaper Aberdeen Press and Journal viewed "Sing It Back" as a "Balearic hit". In her review of the I Am Not a Doctor album, Heather Phares from AllMusic described it as a "techno torch song". A reviewer from Daily Record said it is "their best single since 1996's Fun For Me". Stevie Chick from NME wrote, "Róisín Murphy, it must be said, has a remarkable voice, a chalky, skewed howl which can twist into a purr, a cry or a sexy growl. On 'Sing It Back', she's cast as Eartha Kitt, all unquenchable lust, sly, coquettish snarls, a luxuriant, lingering sigh. What a shame it's wasted on some of the limpest, radio-friendly handbag tedium ever put on wax."

Music video
The music video was produced to promote the single, directed by Dawn Shadforth. It features Moloko vocalist Róisín Murphy dancing alone in a metallic flapper dress, accompanied by psychedelic lighting effects. The video is featured on the DVD of Moloko's special edition for the Statues album. Several live videos exist as well, including one in the group's live concert movie 11,000 Clicks, a similar concert version from the Dutch Pinkpop broadcast, a televised version from the TV show Later... with Jools Holland, and a samba version featured on MTV Brasil.

Impact and legacy
Q Magazine ranked "Sing It Back" at number 905 in their list of the "1001 Best Songs Ever" in 2002. Australian music channel Max placed it at number 887 in their list of "1000 Greatest Songs of All Time" in 2012. German magazine Musikexpress listed the song as number 449 in their ranking of the "700 Best Songs of All-Time" in 2014. Mixmag put the song in their list of "Vocal House: The 30 All-Time Biggest Anthems" in 2018. Tomorrowland featured the song in their "Official The Ibiza 500" at number 55. Rolling Stone ranked the song at 152 in their 2022 list of the 200 Greatest Dance Songs of All Time.

Track listings

 UK CD1
 "Sing It Back" (Tee's radio) – 3:25
 "Sing It Back" (Booker T Loco Mix) – 5:21
 "Sing It Back" (DJ Plankton's Dub featuring Maurice) – 8:33

 UK CD2
 "Sing It Back" (Boris Musical Mix edit) – 4:38
 "Sing It Back" (Herbert's Tasteful Dub) – 5:38
 "Sing It Back" (Tee's Freeze Mix) – 9:02

 UK 12-inch single
A. "Sing It Back" (Tee's Freeze Mix) – 9:02
B. "Sing It Back" (Boris Musical Mix) – 9:19

 UK cassette single
 "Sing It Back" (Boris Musical Mix edit) – 4:38
 "Sing It Back" (Can 7 Supermarket Mix edit) – 4:03
 "Sing It Back" (Tee's radio mix) – 4:23

 French CD single
 "Sing It Back" (Boris Musical Mix edit) – 4:38
 "Sing It Back" (Tee's radio) – 3:25

 German CD single
 "Sing It Back" (Boris radio edit) – 3:35
 "Sing It Back" (Boris Musical Mix) – 9:15

 Australian CD single
 "Sing It Back" (Boris Dlugosch Musical Mix edit) – 4:38
 "Sing It Back" (Can 7 Supermarket Mix edit) – 4:03
 "Sing It Back" (Boris Dlugosch Musical Mix) – 9:17
 "Sing It Back" (Tee's Freeze Mix) – 9:02
 "Sing It Back" (Can 7 Supermarket Mix) – 8:19

Charts

Weekly charts

Year-end charts

Certifications

Covers
 In 2012 Andy Caldwell and Michael Teixeira collaborated on a cover, featuring vocals by Lisa Donnelly.
 In 2015 the Swingrowers released an electro swing cover of the original.
 In December 2017, Pete Tong released a version, featuring Becky Hill, on his album Ibiza Classics.

See also
 List of number-one dance singles of 1999 (U.S.)

References

1999 singles
Moloko songs
1998 songs
The Echo Label singles
Sire Records singles
Warner Records singles
Songs written by Róisín Murphy
UK Independent Singles Chart number-one singles
Songs written by Mark Brydon